The 351st Air Refueling Squadron (351st ARS) is part of the 100th Air Refueling Wing at RAF Mildenhall, England. Since 1992, it has operated the Boeing KC-135R/T Stratotanker aircraft conducting primarily aerial refueling but also airlift and aeromedical evacuation missions.

It previously flew the Boeing B-17 Flying Fortress during World War II and the Boeing B-47E Stratojet between 1956 and 1966 as the 351st Bombardment Squadron.

History

World War II

First established as the 351st Bombardment Squadron (Heavy) on 1 June 1942, the squadron flew the Boeing B-17 Flying Fortress from November 1942, initially as part of the Third Air Force in the southeast, before transferring to the Second Air Force in the Pacific Northwest.  The 351st BS operated as an Operational Training Unit in the Midwest until being deployed to the European Theater of Operations, being assigned to VIII Bomber Command at RAF Thorpe Abbotts, England, on 9 June 1943.

Engaged in strategic bombardment operations over Occupied Europe and Germany, sustaining very heavy losses of personnel and aircraft while conducting many unescorted missions over enemy territory attacking airfields, industries, naval facilities and transportation hubs.   During the summer of 1944, aircrews bombed enemy positions at Saint-Lô, followed by similar campaigns at Brest, France in August and September. In October 1944, the squadron attacked enemy and ground defenses in the allied drive on the Siegfried Line, then bombed marshaling yards, German occupied villages, and communication targets in the Ardennes during the Battle of the Bulge from December 1944 to January 1945.  Attacked enemy targets in Germany during the spring of 1945, ending combat operations with the German Capitulation in May 1945.

Remained in Europe as part of the United States Air Forces in Europe occupation forces, dropping food to the people in the west of the Netherlands, and in June transported French Allied former prisoners of war from Austria to France. Demobilizing in England, in December 1945 the squadron inactivated as a paper unit.

Air Force Reserve
Activated in the reserves in 1947 at Miami Army Air Field, Florida.  Unclear whether or not the unit was manned or equipped; inactivated in 1949 due to budget restrictions.

Strategic Air Command bombardment operations
The unit was reactivated under Strategic Air Command on 1 January 1956 as the 351st Bombardment Squadron, Medium. Based at Portsmouth Air Force Base (later Pease AFB), New Hampshire, the 351st BS (M) were equipped with 15 new, swept wing Boeing B-47E Stratojets which were designed to carry nuclear weapons and to penetrate Soviet air defenses. The 351st BS (M) deployed to RAF Brize Norton, Oxfordshire, from 29 December 1957 to 1 April 1958.

The squadron flew the B-47 for about a decade when by the mid-1960s it had become obsolete and vulnerable to new Soviet air defenses. The squadron began to send its Stratojets to AMARC at Davis–Monthan AFB, Arizona, for retirement in 1965, and the unit was inactivated on 25 June 1966, one of the last B-47 Squadrons.

Air refueling in Europe

The unit was reactivated at RAF Mildenhall, Suffolk, in the United Kingdom on 31 March 1992 as the 351st Air Refueling Squadron, operating the Boeing KC-135R Stratotanker.  The first KC-135R to arrive at Mildenhall for the 351st ARS was 58-0100 on 19 May 1992 from Loring Air Force Base, Maine. Nine KC-135Rs had arrived by September 1992. Following their reactivation, the 351st ARS went on to support Operations Provide Comfort, Restore Hope and Northern Watch.
 
In April 1996, the 351st ARS contributed to Operation Assured Response, deploying three KC-135s to Dakar-Yoff International Airport, Senegal, to help support the evacuation of U.S. citizens and third country nationals from Liberia after fighting flared up in Monrovia during the First Liberian Civil War.

In March 1998, the 351st ARS participated in Exercise Strong Resolve 98 at Sola Air Station, Norway.  After the European Tanker Task Force (ETTF) was ended on 28 November 1998, the number of KC-135s assigned to the 351st ARS was increased to 15 tankers. In 1999, the squadron supported Operation Allied Force, NATO intervention during the Kosovo War, as the 351st Expeditionary Air Refueling Squadron (351st EARS).

In October 2001, the 351st EARS deployed 12 tankers: four to Incirlik Air Base, Turkey; another four to Rhein-Main Air Base, Germany; and a final four to Souda Bay, Greece, in support of Operation Enduring Freedom (OEF). On 23 November 2001, KC-135s deployed to Burgas Airport in Bulgaria, from where they conducted OEF missions.

In March 2011, the 351st Air Refueling Squadron deployed a portion of its KC-135 Stratotanker fleet to Istres-Le Tubé Air Base, France, in support of Operation Unified Protector, as the 351st EARS.

Since 2013, the 351st EARS, has regularly deployed to Morón Air Base, Spain in support of Operation Juniper Micron – which aims to assist French operations in Mali. The first deployment occurred on 13 January 2013. In June 2013, the 351st ARS refuelled three Luftwaffe McDonnell Douglas F-4F Phantom IIs of JG 71 on their last air-to-air refueling sortie before their retirement on 29 June 2013. In October 2014, the 351st ARS was awarded the 2013 Gen. Carl A. Spaatz Trophy, which is given to the best USAF air refueling squadron, becoming the first unit based outside of the United States to win the award.

On 22 February 2019, KC-135R 57-1493 of the 351st ARS participated in a flypast over Sheffield to mark the 75th anniversary of the crash of B-17G 42-31322 (Mi Amigo), which saw the loss of all ten crew on board. In 2019, to mark the 75th anniversary of Operation Overlord, two KC-135Rs (58-0100 and 62-3551) received special schemes to reflect the squadron's participation in 1944.

Between 29 September and 1 October 2020, the 351st ARS conducted Exercise Wolff Pack, a surge operation to test the 100th ARW's ability to deploy its aircraft to multiple areas across Europe, which included an elephant walk of 12 of the squadron's 15 KC-135s. The 351st ARS participated in the 2020 Nigeria hostage rescue on 31 October, forward deploying six tankers to Morón Air Base from where they provided air refueling support for the operation.

In May 2021, nose art (Skipper III) was unveiled on KC-135R 59-1470 in honour of 100th BG Master Sergeant Dewey Christopher, who maintained B-17s Skipper and Skipper II during World War II. The same month, the 351st ARS were awarded the 2020 Gen. Carl A. Spaatz Trophy, winning it for a second time. The 351st ARS also participated in Exercise Atlantic Trident 2021 during May, operating alongside the French Air and Space Force and USAF F-35A Lightning IIs from the 4th Fighter Squadron. Between 18 and 21 May, the 351st ARS hosted the 2021 European Tanker Symposium, which saw a McDonnell Douglas KC-10 Extender and a Royal Air Force Voyager KC3 deploy to Mildenhall.

Another tanker (58-0089) was unveiled the following month in dedication of Lt. Col. Robert "Rosie" Rosenthal, who was assigned to the 100th BG between September 1943 and September 1944.

The 2022 Russian invasion of Ukraine led to an increased number of sorties by the 351st ARS, supporting NATO's Enhanced Air Policing.

Nose art

The 15 based KC-135R/T tankers typically wear nose art to reflect the 100th ARW's history as a Bombardment Group during WWII, since 2021 this has included:

 All American Girl (B-17G 42-37936)
 Big Gas Bird (B-17G 42-30799 of 349th BS)
 Black Jack (B-17G 42-30086)
 Boss Lady (B-17G 42-102611 of 350th BS)
 High Life (B-17F 42-30080)
 Holy Terror (B-17G 42-31062)
 Homesick Angel (not associated)
 Hundred Proof (B-17G 42-98015 of 349th BS)
 Miss Irish (B-17G 42-31968 of 350th BS)
 Our Gal Sal (B-17G 42-31767)
 Skipper III (B-17F 42-3307 & B-17G 42-31708 of 351st BS)
 Rosie's Riveters (B-17F 42-30758 & B-17G 42-31504 of 418th BS)
 Sly Fox (B-17F 42-30278 of 418th BS)
 The Jester (not associated)
 The Reluctant Dragon (B-17G 43-38011 of 349th BS)
 The Savage (B-17G 42-31710 of 349th BS)
 Wolff Pack (B-17F 42-30061 of 418th BS)

Lineage
 Constituted as the 351st Bombardment Squadron (Heavy) on 28 January 1942
 Activated on 1 June 1942
 Redesignated 351st Bombardment Squadron, Heavy on 20 August 1943
 Inactivated on 15 December 1945
 Redesignated 351st Bombardment Squadron, Very Heavy on 3 July 1947
 Activated in the reserve on 17 July 1947
 Inactivated on 27 June 1949
 Redesignated 351st Bombardment Squadron, Medium on 1 August 1955
 Activated on 1 January 1956
 Discontinued and inactivated on 25 June 1966
 Redesignated 351st Air Refueling Squadron on 26 March 1992
 Activated on 31 March 1992

Assignments
 100th Bombardment Group, 1 June 1942 – 15 December 1945
 100th Bombardment Group, 17 July 1947 – 27 June 1949
 100th Bombardment Wing, 1 January 1956 – 25 June 1966
 100th Operations Group, 31 March 1992 – present

Stations

 Orlando Army Air Base, Florida 1 June 1942
 Barksdale Field, Louisiana, c. 18 June 1942
 Pendleton Field, Oregon c. 26 June 1942
 Gowen Field, Idaho, 28 August 1942
 Walla Walla Army Air Field, Washington, c. 1 November 1942
 Wendover Field, Utah, c. 30 November 1942
 Sioux City Army Air Base, Iowa, c. 28 December 1942
 Kearney Army Air Field, Nebraska, c. 30 January – May 1943
 RAF Thorpe Abbotts (Station 139), England, 9 June 1943 – December 1945
 Camp Kilmer, New Jersey, c. 20–21 December 1945
 Miami Army Air Field, Florida, 29 May 1947 – 27 June 1949
 Portsmouth Air Force Base (later Pease Air Force Base), New Hampshire, 1 January 1956 – 30 April 1966
 RAF Mildenhall, England, 31 March 1992 – present

Aircraft operated
 Boeing B-17 Flying Fortress (1942–1945)
 Boeing B-47E Stratojet (1956–1966)
 Boeing KC-135R/T Stratotanker (1992–present)

References

Bibliography

 
 
 
 
 

Air refueling squadrons of the United States Air Force